Ethminolia hornungi is a species of sea snail, a marine gastropod mollusk in the family Trochidae, the top snails.

Description

Distribution
This species occurs in the Red Sea.

References

hornungi
Gastropods described in 1931